Xuanwu or Xuandi, also known as Zhenwu or Zhenwudadi, is a powerful deity in Chinese religion, one of the higher-ranking deities in Taoism. He is revered as a powerful god, able to control the elements and capable of great magic. He is identified as the god of the north Heidi (and is particularly revered by martial artists. He is the patron god of Hebei, Henan, Manchuria and Mongolia. As some Han Chinese (now the modern-day Cantonese and Fujianese peoples) migrated into the south from Hebei and Henan during the Tang-Song era, Xuanwu is also widely revered in the Guangdong, Guangxi and Fujian provinces, as well as among the overseas diaspora.

Since the usurping Yongle Emperor of the Ming dynasty claimed to receive the divine assistance of Xuanwu during his successful Jingnan Campaign against his nephew, he had a number of Taoist monasteries constructed in the Wudang Mountains of Hubei, where Xuanwu allegedly attained immortality.

Black Tortoise
 
Xuanwu is one of the Four Symbols of the Chinese constellations, representing the north and the winter season. It is usually depicted as a turtle entwined together with a snake.

Stories

The original story
One story says that Xuanwu was originally a prince of Jing Le State in northern Hebei during the time of the Yellow Emperor.  As he grew up, he felt the sorrow and pain of the life of ordinary people and wanted to retire to a remote mountain for cultivation of the Tao.

Qing Dynasty version
Another says that Xuanwu was originally a butcher who had killed many animals mercilessly. Yet as time passed, his conscience grew and he felt remorse for his actions. Upon repenting, he abandoned butchery and retired to a remote mountain for cultivation of the Tao.

One day, after assisting a woman in labor, as he cleaned her blood stained clothes in a river nearby, the words "Dark (or Mysterious) Heavenly Highest Deity" ( Xuántiān Shàngdì) appeared before him. The woman in labor was a manifestation of the goddess Guanyin. To redeem his sins, he dug out his own stomach and intestines and washed them in the river. The river then became dark and murky. After a while, the river flowed clear and pure once again.

Unfortunately, Xuanwu lost his stomach and intestines while he was washing them in the river. The Jade Emperor was moved by his sincerity and determination to clear his sins, and made him an immortal with the title of Xuántiān Shàngdì.

After he became an immortal, his stomach and intestines absorbed the essence of the earth. His viscera transformed into a demonic turtle and a demonic snake, who started to hurt people. No one could subdue the demonic animals. Eventually, Xuanwu returned to earth to subdue them. After defeating them, he later used them as his subordinates.

Generals Wan Gong and Wan Ma

Xuanwu is sometimes portrayed with two generals standing besides him, General Wan Gong and General Wan Ma. The two generals are deities that handle many local issues from children's birth, medication, family matters as well as fengshui consultation.

Worship

Depiction
Xuanwu is portrayed as a warrior in dark-coloured imperial robes, his left hand holding the "three mountain seal", somewhat similar to Guan Yu's hand seal, while his right hand is holding a sword, which is said to have belonged to Lü Dongbin, one of the Eight Immortals.

Another legend says that he borrowed the sword from Lü Dongbin to subdue a strong demon, and after being successful, he refused to bring it back after witnessing the sword's power. The sword itself would magically return to its owner if Xuanwu released it, so it is said that he always holds his sword tightly and is unable to release it. However, not only does he outrank Lü in terms of divinity, Xuanwu also dates back longer in history than Lü Dongbin, putting this claim in suspect.

He is usually seated on a throne with the right foot stepping on the snake and left leg extended stepping on the turtle. His face is usually red with bulging eyes. His birthday is celebrated on the third day of the third lunar month.

Worship in Indonesia
In Indonesia, almost every Taoist temple provides an altar for Xuantian Shangdi. The story states that the first temple that worshiped him was a temple at Welahan Town, Jepara, Central Java. And the temples that were built in honor of him are the temples at Gerajen and Bugangan, Semarang City, Central Java. His festival is celebrated annually every the 25th day, 2nd month, of Chinese calendar. The worshipers of Chen Fu Zhen Ren, especially at Tik Liong Tian Temple, Rogojampi, Banyuwangi Regency, East Java, believe that Xuantian Shangdi is their patron deity. That's why they put his altar at the right side of Chen Fu Zhen Ren's altar, in the middle room of the temple which is always reserved for the main deity.

Worship in Thailand
Xuanwu is known among the Thai people as Chao Pho Suea (Tiger God) or Tua Lao Yah ( "Big Deity") according by Teochew dialect. There are many shrines that worship him in the country and the most famous shrine is Bangkok's San Chao Pho Suea near Giant Swing and Sam Phraeng neighbourhood. This shrine has been highly worshipped with both Thais and Chinese, especially in Chinese New Year's Day.

Popular culture
 In the classic novel Journey to the West, Xuanwu was a king of the north who had two generals serving under him, a "Tortoise General" and a "Snake General". This king had a temple at Wudang Mountains in Hubei, thus there is a Tortoise Mountain and a Snake Mountain on the opposite sides of a river in Wuhan, the capital of Hubei.
 In recent times, Xuanwu is a central character in the popular urban fantasy series by Kylie Chan: The Dark Heavens Trilogy, the Journey to Wudang Trilogy, and the Celestial Battle Trilogy.
 Xuanwu lives in Kansas City and is served by monks and shadow-shifting ninjas in Shayne Silver's book Black Sheep which is part of the Feathers and Fire series.

References

Chinese gods
Mercurian deities
Deities in Taoism
Taoism in Guangdong